Paul Thornley is a British actor.

He has appeared on stage in productions of A Chorus of Disapproval at the Harold Pinter Theatre, The Three Musketeers at the Rose Theatre, Kingston and It's a Wonderful Life at the Wolsey Theatre.

Thornley played Dodge in the Original Cast of London Road at the Royal National Theatre, a role which he later reprised in the film of the same name.

In 2016, he played Ron Weasley in the Original London Cast of Harry Potter and the Cursed Child at the Palace Theatre, London in the West End. He was nominated for Best Supporting Actor in a Play at the 2017 Whatsonstage.com Awards. Thornley reprised his role as Ron Weasley on Broadway at the Lyric Theater in 2018.

For video games, Thornley provided the voice for Olgierd von Everec in the Hearts of Stone expansion for The Witcher 3: Wild Hunt in 2015. In 2018, he voiced a major protagonist named Addam Origo in the game Xenoblade Chronicles 2: Torna – The Golden Country.

Filmography

References

21st-century British male actors
Living people
British male stage actors
Place of birth missing (living people)
Year of birth missing (living people)